Utut Adianto Wahyuwidayat (born 16 March 1965), commonly known as Utut Adianto is an Indonesian politician and chess player, who is serving as a member of the People's Representative Council since 2009. A member of the Indonesian Democratic Party of Struggle, he served as Deputy Speaker of the People's Representative Council from 2018 until 2019. Prior to his entry in politics, he was a chess player, attaining the title of Grandmaster from FIDE in 1986.

Early life and education 
Utut Adianto Wahyuwidayat was born in Jakarta on 16 March 1965. He is the fourth child of five children. He spent his childhood in Damai alley, near Cipete Market, South Jakarta. Utut studied at Padjadjaran University. He finished his studies in 1989, and worked in a in development company.

Chess career 
He was first interested in chess through his brother. In 1973, when he was 8 years old, he took lessons at the Kencana Chees Club chess club. He won the Jakarta Junior Championship in 1978, at the age of 12.Then he won the National Junior Champion in 1979. He would go on to win the Indonesian Chess Championship in 1982. He was awarded the title Grandmaster in 1986, becoming the youngest Indonesian to do so at the time (at 21 years old), though that record has since been surpassed by Susanto Megaranto, who became grandmaster at the age of 17. Between 1995 and 1999, he maintained an Elo rating of over 2600.

In 1999, he participated in the FIDE world championship in Las Vegas, held with the knockout format, losing to Daniel Fridman in the first round. Utut Adianto is chairman of the Indonesian Chess Federation (PERCASI), together with Machnan R. Kamaluddin, Eka Putra Wirya and Kristianus Liem, he later founded a chess school in Indonesia, which has produced several national players. In 2005, Adianto was awarded the title of FIDE Senior Trainer.

Notable games 
The following is a list of notable games of Utut.

FIDE ratings

Political career 
On 9 May 2009, he was elected to the People's Representative Council, the lower house of Indonesia's bicameral parliament. He became deputy speaker of the body on 20 March 2018.

References

External links 
 
 
 
 
 
 
 Sekolah Catur Utut Adianto (chess school) 

1965 births
Living people
Balinese people
Chess coaches
Chess grandmasters
Chess Olympiad competitors
Indonesian chess players
Indonesian Democratic Party of Struggle politicians
Members of the People's Representative Council, 2009
Members of the People's Representative Council, 2014
Members of the People's Representative Council, 2019
Sportspeople from Jakarta
Chess players at the 2006 Asian Games
Asian Games competitors for Indonesia